Charles Mulinga (born 5 April 1968) is a Zambian long-distance runner. He competed in the men's 10,000 metres at the 1996 Summer Olympics.

References

1968 births
Living people
Athletes (track and field) at the 1996 Summer Olympics
Zambian male long-distance runners
Olympic athletes of Zambia
Athletes (track and field) at the 1990 Commonwealth Games
Commonwealth Games competitors for Zambia
Place of birth missing (living people)